Vice Admiral Sir John Willson Musgrave Eaton,  (3 November 1902 – 21 July 1981) was a Royal Navy officer who served as Commander-in-Chief America and West Indies Station from 1955 to 1956.

Naval career
Eaton joined the Royal Navy in 1916 and served in the First World War. After the war he served in destroyers and then in submarines.

Eaton served in the Second World War and commanded the destroyers HMS Venetia, HMS Mohawk, HMS Somali and HMS Eskimo.

After the war he became Captain of the cruiser  and then Captain of the training school HMS St Vincent. He was appointed Director at the Royal Navy Staff College, Greenwich in 1949, Flag Officer commanding HM Australian Fleet in 1951 and Flag Officer commanding the Reserve Fleet in 1954. His last appointment was as Commander-in-Chief, America and West Indies Station and Deputy Supreme Allied Commander Atlantic in 1955; he took part in Operation Strikeback (a major NATO training exercise) in 1957 and retired in 1958.

His life is commemorated by an inscription at the Church of St. Mary the Virgin in Kelvedon in Essex.

References

|-

|-

1902 births
1981 deaths
Companions of the Distinguished Service Order
Companions of the Order of the Bath
Knights Commander of the Order of the British Empire
People from Bulawayo
Recipients of the Distinguished Service Cross (United Kingdom)
Royal Navy vice admirals
Royal Navy personnel of World War I
Royal Navy officers of World War II
People from Kelvedon